Podophyllum is a genus of flowering plant in the family Berberidaceae, native from Afghanistan to China, and from southeast Canada to the central and eastern United States. The genus was first described by Carl Linnaeus in 1753.

Taxonomy
The taxonomic status of the genus has varied. Some sources transferred all but Podophyllum peltatum to other genera, such as Dysosma and Sinopodophyllum. , Plants of the World Online regarded these genera as synonyms of Podophyllum.

Species
, Plants of the World Online accepted the following species:
Podophyllum aurantiocaule Hand.-Mazz.
Podophyllum cymosum (Michx.) Christenh. & Byng
Podophyllum delavayi Franch.
Podophyllum difforme Hemsl. & E.H.Wilson
Podophyllum emeiense (J.L.Wu & P.Zhuang) J.M.H.Shaw
Podophyllum glaucescens J.M.H.Shaw
Podophyllum grayi (F.Schmidt) Christenh. & Byng
Podophyllum guangxiense (Y.S.Wang) J.M.H.Shaw
Podophyllum hemsleyi J.M.H.Shaw & Stearn
Podophyllum hexandrum Royle
Podophyllum majoense Gagnep.
Podophyllum peltatum L.
Podophyllum pleianthum Hance
Podophyllum sinense (H.L.Li) Christenh. & Byng
Podophyllum trilobulum J.M.H.Shaw
Podophyllum tsayuense (T.S.Ying) Christenh. & Byng
Podophyllum versipelle Hance

References

Berberidaceae
Berberidaceae genera